Dhandal  is a village in Kapurthala district of Punjab State, India. The village is administrated by a Sarpanch who is an elected representative of village as per the constitution of India and Panchayati raj (India).

Demography 
According to the report published by Census India in 2011, Dhandal has a total number of 122 houses and population of 524 of which include 261 males and 263 females. Literacy rate of Dhandal is 60.14%, lower than state average of 75.84%.  The population of children under the age of 6 years is 95 which is  18.13% of total population of Dhandal, and child sex ratio is approximately  1065, higher than state average of 846.

Caste  
The village has schedule caste (SC) constitutes 52.48% of total population of the village and it doesn't have any Schedule Tribe (ST) population,

Population data

Air travel connectivity 
The closest airport to the village is Sri Guru Ram Dass Jee International Airport.

Villages in Kapurthala

References

External links
  Villages in Kapurthala
 Kapurthala Villages List

Villages in Kapurthala district